Paul Gerhard Heaver (born February 15, 1955) is a British-Canadian former professional ice hockey player who played in the World Hockey Association (WHA). Drafted in the sixth round of the 1975 NHL Amateur Draft by the Atlanta Flames, Heaver opted to play in the WHA after being selected by the Toronto Toros in the third round of the 1975 WHA Amateur Draft. He played parts of two WHA seasons for the Toros and Birmingham Bulls. 

Heaver was born in Paddington, England, United Kingdom, but grew up in Toronto, Ontario. As a youth, he played in the 1967 Quebec International Pee-Wee Hockey Tournament with the Toronto Swiss Chalet minor ice hockey team.

References

External links

1955 births
Living people
Atlanta Flames draft picks
Birmingham Bulls players
Buffalo Norsemen players
Canadian ice hockey defencemen
Charlotte Checkers (SHL) players
English emigrants to Canada
Ice hockey people from Toronto
Mohawk Valley Comets (NAHL) players
Oshawa Generals players
People from Paddington
Toronto Toros draft picks
Toronto Toros players